James Kennedy was an Irish Anglican priest in the mid 19th  century.

Kennedy was born in Ireland and educated  at Trinity College, Dublin.  He was  Archdeacon of Waterford from 1831 until his resignation in 1845, after which he was the Rector of the church at Abington.

References

19th-century Irish Anglican priests
Archdeacons of Waterford
Christian clergy from Dublin (city)
Alumni of Trinity College Dublin